Richmond–Croydon Road is a continuous  road route in the Richmond, Croydon and Etheridge local government areas of Queensland, Australia. It is also part of the inland freight network linking cattle properties to major freight routes on the Landsborough and Flinders highways.

Route description
It starts as Goldring Street, running generally north-west through the locality of Richmond. It passes the Richmond Airport and crosses the Flinders River soon after leaving the town.

It re-enters Victoria Vale and turns north-west. It then enters  and continues generally north until it reaches the northern boundary. Crossing the boundary it enters , where it continues mainly north-west. Reaching the western boundary it loosely follows it until it reaches the Gulf Developmental Road, where it ends at a T-junction.

The section within Gilbert River is in the Etheridge local government area.

Land use along this road is mainly stock grazing on native vegetation. There are no major intersections on this road.

Road names
Various sections of the road are known as Richmond–Woolgar Road, Richmond Road, and Croydon Road. Not all mapping systems use the same names for the sections. The name "Richmond–Croydon Road" is used in this article as the most definitive for the entire road.

Road condition
As at April 2022 the road has approximately  single lane sealed, split into sections, and approximately  single lane unsealed.

History

Richmond Downs pastoral run was established in 1864. The town was surveyed in 1882, and the railway arrived in 1904. The town became the administrative centre for the district. There are many large properties (cattle stations) to the north of Richmond, including Middle Park (in Woolgar), Kalda and Etheldale (in Saxby), and Walker Park (in Burleigh).

Croydon pastoral run was established in the 1880s. Gold was discovered in 1885, and by 1887 the town 
had a population of 7,000. The railway from  arrived in 1891. The town was surrounded by other cattle stations, and became the administrative centre for the district, serving both the miners and the cattle stations.

Early roads were cut from both Richmond and Croydon to provide access for wheeled vehicles to the pastoral runs and other settlements. Over time these tracks were improved and extended to eventually form a through road.

Modern usage
Although not yet fully sealed the road is used extensively by road trains carrying cattle, and by other large trucks conveying heavy goods. The road is described in a Queensland Government regional map as the "Cattle Corridor Byway".

References

Roads in Queensland